Sanjeevaiah, Sanjeevayya or Sanjivaiah (Telugu: సంజీవయ్య) is an Indian given name: There are different pages in Wikipedia to link to it:

 Damodaram Sanjivayya - was the chief minister of Andhra Pradesh, India.
 Sanjeevaiah Park railway station - is a railway station in Hyderabad, Telangana, India. 
 Sanjeevaiah Park - is a public greenspace and park in the heart of Hyderabad, India. 
 Sri Damodaram Sanjeevaiah Thermal Power Station - is located in Nelatur Village, near Krishnapatnam and at a distance of 23 km from Nellore city of Andhra Pradesh.